Hallermann–Streiff syndrome is a congenital disorder that affects growth, cranial development, hair-growth, and dental development. There are fewer than 200 people with the syndrome worldwide. One notable organization that is supporting people with Hallermann–Streiff syndrome is the Germany-based "Schattenkinder e.V".

Presentation
Patients with this syndrome are shorter than the average person and may not develop hair in many places, including in the facial, leg and pubic areas. Patients also have eye problems including reduced eye size, bilateral cataracts and glaucoma. The syndrome can be associated with sleep apnea. The physical characteristics of the syndrome can result in difficult intubation by medical professionals. Intelligence is usually normal.

Cause
The genetic cause of Hallermann–Streiff syndrome has not been conclusively determined. It is most likely due to a de novo mutation, and it may be associated with the GJA1 gene.

Diagnosis
Diagnosis is based on the physical characteristics and symptoms. There is no established clinical genetic testing for Hallermann–Streiff syndrome, however some laboratories offer research genetic testing for the condition.

Treatment
There is no cure for Hallermann–Streiff syndrome. Treatments center around the particular symptoms in each individual. Early measures are based around ensuring proper breathing and intake of nutrients and may include a tracheostomy. Early surgery for cataracts may be recommended, however some studies have suggested that spontaneous resolution of cataracts occurs in up to 50% of untreated patients. Regular visits to an ophthalmologist to monitor and deal with other eye problems, some of which may require surgery, are strongly recommended.

Management of the condition may also include surgical reconstruction of certain craniofacial malformations (particularly in the mandibular and nasal region) at an appropriate age. Additionally, management for certain heart defects, such as medication or surgery, may be needed.

History
It is named after German ophthalmologist Wilhelm Hallermann (1909–2005) and Italian–Swiss ophthalmologist Enrico Bernardo Streiff (1908–1988), who first described the syndrome in 1948 and 1950 respectively.

References

12. Shandilya VK, Parmar LD, Shandilya AV. Functional ambulation with bent knee prostheses for an adult with bilateral 90 degrees knee flexion contractures—A case report. J Family Med Prim Care [serial online] 2020 [cited 2020 Jun 2];9:2492-5. Available from: http://www.jfmpc.com/text.asp?2020/9/5/2492/285055

External links 
 Jablonski's Syndrome Database

Ailments of unknown cause
Rare diseases
Syndromes affecting the eye
Congenital disorders of eye, ear, face and neck
Congenital disorders of musculoskeletal system
Syndromes affecting stature